Whitehurst may refer to:

People:
 Albert Whitehurst, English footballer
 Andrew Whitehurst, British visual effects artist
 Billy Whitehurst, English professional footballer during the 1980s
 Charlie Whitehurst, NFL quarterback
 David Whitehurst, professional American football player
 Agent M (Emily Grace Whitehurst), punk rock singer
 Frederic Whitehurst, FBI special agent
 G. William Whitehurst (George William Whitehurst), professor and retired politician who served in the United States House of Representatives
 George William Whitehurst (judge), United States federal judge
 Grover Whitehurst, director of the Institute of Education Sciences
 Jim Whitehurst, Chief Executive Officer at Red Hat
 John Whitehurst, English clockmaker and scientist
 Logan Whitehurst, American musician
 Mickey Whitehurst, North Carolina State college football coach from 1907-1908
 Rob Whitehurst, American production sound mixer and audio engineer
 Steven Whitehurst, African American author, poet, and educator
 Wally Whitehurst (Walter Richard Whitehurst), former right-handed pitcher in Major League Baseball
 Walter Whitehurst, English footballer

Things:
 USS Whitehurst (DE-634), Buckley class destroyer escort of the United States Navy named in honor of Henry Purefoy Whitehurst
 Whitehurst Freeway, elevated highway over K Street and Water Street in the Georgetown neighborhood of Washington, D.C.
 William L. Whitehurst Field, county-owned, public-use airport